Capstick is an English surname, it may refer to:

John H. Capstick (1856–1918), American Republican Party politician
John Walton Capstick (1838–1937), English Bursar of Trinity College, Cambridge
Peter Hathaway Capstick (1940–1996), American hunter and author
Tony Capstick (1944–2003), British comedian, actor, musician and broadcaster

English-language surnames